Kappa Gamma Psi is a performing arts fraternity in the United States that was founded in 1913. Its last surviving collegiate chapter (Iota) went inactive in 2008, but the National Organization continues and is founding alumni chapters. Its membership was restricted to males, before it became coeducational in the 1970s.

Founding
Kappa Gamma Psi was founded on December 11, 1913 by twelve faculty members at the New England Conservatory of Music in Boston, Massachusetts.

Chapters
These are the chapters of Kappa Gamma Psi. Active chapters noted in bold, inactive chapters noted in italics.  Iota chapter, at Ithaca College in upstate New York (founded in 1929), was the last active chapter, becoming dormant in 2008. Members of several former chapters remain in contact and gather periodically.

Composition contest and commissioned works
Kappa Gamma Psi's Iota chapter (Ithaca College) formerly sponsored a competition for new compositions. The widely performed band composition The Leaves Are Falling, by the American composer Warren Benson, was commissioned by Kappa Gamma Psi in 1963. Deux Preludes, a work for flute, clarinet, and bassoon by the Czech-born composer Karel Husa, was commissioned by the Iota chapter in 1966. Elie Siegmeister's Sextet for Brass and Percussion was commissioned in 1966. In 1974, the Iota chapter commissioned Alfred Reed's Double Wind Quintet.

Notable members
Halim El-Dabh, composer (1921-2017)
Bert Remsen, actor (1925–1999)

Notable honorary members
Harold Bauer
Joseph Bonner
Pablo Casals
Philip Greeley Clapp
Ferdinand Dunkley
 Frank Battisti
George Eastman
Duke Ellington
Ossip Gabrilowitsch
Philip Hale
Louis Hasselmans
Hans Kindler
Fritz Kreisler
Erich Leinsdorf
George Longy
Béla Böszörményi-Nagy
Ignace Paderewski
Attilio Poto
Leroy Robinson
Jesús María Sanromá
Nicholas Schwalt
Elie Siegmeister
Lawrence Tibbett
Roman Tottenburg
Bruno Walter
William L. Whitney

References

External links
Kappa Gamma Psi official site

1913 establishments in Massachusetts
Student organizations established in 1913
Student societies in the United States